Johann Philip Bachmann (1762–1837) was a notable organ builder. He was born in Creuzburg, Thuringia, Germany. He emigrated to the United States in 1793 and worked with David Tannenberg. In 1793, he married Tannenberg’s daughter, who committed suicide in 1799. 

Bachmann’s organ-building career began when Tannenberg, concerned that he lacked an apprentice, asked (and received) permission from the Moravian elders to obtain one from Herrnhut, another Moravian community. Bachmann transported an organ from Tannenberg's shop in Lititz, Pennsylvania to Salem, North Carolina where he installed it at the newly built Home Moravian Church. The organ has been restored by Taylor & Boody, and now resides at Old Salem Visitor's Center in Winston-Salem, North Carolina.
In 1800, a disagreement occurred between master and apprentice, although Bachmann did install the 1802 Tannenberg organ in Hebron Evangelical Lutheran Church, Madison, Virginia. However, Bachmann did wind up starting his own business — but Tannenberg supplies the pipes of his first organ (built in 1803). In 1837, he became a piano and cabinet builder.

References

External links
 1819 Organ by Philip Bachman

1762 births
1837 deaths
German pipe organ builders
American pipe organ builders
German emigrants to the United States